This list of peace activists includes people who have proactively advocated diplomatic, philosophical, and non-military resolution of major territorial or ideological disputes through nonviolent means and methods. Peace activists usually work with others in the overall anti-war and peace movements to focus the world's attention on what they perceive to be the irrationality of violent conflicts, decisions, and actions. They thus initiate and facilitate wide public dialogues intended to nonviolently alter long-standing societal agreements directly relating to, and held in place by, the various violent, habitual, and historically fearful thought-processes residing at the core of these conflicts, with the intention of peacefully ending the conflicts themselves.

A

 Dekha Ibrahim Abdi (1964–2011) – Kenyan peace activist, government consultant
 David Adams (born 1939) – American author and peace activist, task force chair of the United Nations International Year for the Culture of Peace, coordinator of the Culture of Peace News Network
 Jane Addams (1860–1935) – American, national chairman of Woman's Peace Party, president of Women's International League for Peace and Freedom
 Ruth Adler (1944–1994) – feminist, and human rights campaigner in Scotland
 Eqbal Ahmad (1933/34–1999) – Pakistani political scientist, activist
 Martti Ahtisaari (born 1937) – former president of Finland, active in conflict resolution
 Robert Baker Aitken (1917–2010) – Zen Buddhist Rōshi and anti-war activist, anti-nuclear testing activist, and proponent of deep ecology
 Tadatoshi Akiba (born 1942) – Japanese pacifist and nuclear disarmament advocate, former mayor of Hiroshima
 Widad Akrawi (born 1969) – Danish-Kurdish peace advocate, organizer
 Stew Albert (1939–2006) – American anti-Vietnam war activist, organizer
 Abdulkadir Yahya Ali (1957–2005) – Somali peace activist and founder of the Center for Research and Dialogue in Somalia
 B. R. Ambedkar (1891–1956) – Polymath, economist, jurist, social reformer, civil rights leader, political philosopher and revivalist of Buddhism in India
 Günther Anders (born Günther Siegmund Stern, 1902–1992), was a German philosopher and a critic of nuclear weapons and nuclear deterrence
 Ghassan Andoni (born 1956) – Palestinian physicist, Christian, advocate of non-violent resistance
 Andrea Andreen (1888–1972) – Swedish physician, pacifist, and feminist
 Annot (1894–1981) – German artist, anti-war and anti-nuclear activist
 José Argüelles (1939–2011) – American New Age author and pacifist
 Émile Armand (1872–1963) – French anarchist and pacifist writer
 Émile Arnaud (1864–1921) – French peace campaigner, coined the word "pacifism"
 Klas Pontus Arnoldson (1844–1916) – Swedish pacifist, Nobel peace laureate, founder of the Swedish Peace and Arbitration Society
 Ya'akov Arnon (1913–1995) – Israeli economist, government official and pacifist
 Vittorio Arrigoni (1975–2011) – Italian reporter, anti-war activist
 Pat Arrowsmith (born 1930) – British author and peace campaigner
 Arik Ascherman (born 1959) – Israeli-American rabbi and defender of Palestinian human rights
 Margaret Ashton (1856–1937) – British suffragist, local politician, pacifist
 Julian Assange (born 1971) – founder of WikiLeaks, recipient of numerous prizes and awards, and one of only six people to be recognised with the Gold medal for Peace with Justice of the Sydney Peace Foundation
 Anita Augspurg (1857–1943) – German lawyer, writer, feminist, pacifist
 Uri Avnery (1923–2018) – Israeli writer and founder of Gush Shalom
 Mubarak Awad (born 1943) – Palestinian–American advocate of nonviolent resistance, founder of the Palestinian Centre for the Study of Nonviolence
 Ali Abu Awwad (born 1972) – Palestinian peace activist and proponent of nonviolence from Beit Ummar, founder of Taghyeer (Change) Movement
 Ayo Ayoola-Amale (born 1970) – Nigerian conflict resolution professional, ombudsman, peace builder and poet

B

 Anton Bacalbașa (1865–1899) – Romanian Marxist and pacifist
 Eva Bacon (1909–1994) – Australian socialist, feminist, pacifist
 Gertrud Baer (1890–1981) – German Jewish peace activist, and a founding member of the Women's International League for Peace and Freedom
 Joan Baez (born 1941) – American anti-war protester, inspirational singer
 Matilde Bajer (1840–1934) – Danish feminist and peace activists
 Ella Baker (1903–1986) – African-American civil rights activist, feminist, pacifist
 Emily Greene Balch (1867–1961) – American pacifist, leader of Women's International League for Peace and Freedom, and 1946 Nobel peace laureate
 Ernesto Balducci (1922–1992) – Italian priest and peace activist
 Roger Nash Baldwin (1884–1981) – American pacifist, leader in Civil Liberties Bureau of American Union Against Militarism, supporting conscientious objectors to World War I; lifelong civil libertarian, co-founder of ACLU
 Edith Ballantyne (born 1922) – Czech-Canadian peace activist
 Daniel Barenboim (born 1942) – pianist and conductor, joint founder – with Edward Said – of the West–Eastern Divan Orchestra, citizen of Argentina, Israel, Palestine and Spain
 Christine Ross Barker (1866–1940) – Canadian pacifist and suffragist
 Ludwig Bauer (1878–1935) – Austro-Swiss writer and pacifist
 Archibald Baxter (1881–1970) – New Zealand pacifist, socialist, and anti-war activist
 Alaide Gualberta Beccari (1842–1906) – Italian feminist, pacifist and social reformer
 Yolanda Becerra (born 1959) – Colombian feminist and peace activist
 Henriette Beenfeldt (1878–1949) – radical Danish peace activist
 Harry Belafonte (born 1927) – American anti-war protester, performer
 Carlos Filipe Ximenes Belo (born 1948) – East Timorese bishop, Nobel peace laureate
 Pope Benedict XV (1854–1922, Pope 1914–1922) – advocated peace throughout WW1; opposed aerial warfare; promoted humanitarian initiatives to protect children, prisoners of war, the wounded and missing persons
 Medea Benjamin (born 1952) – American author, organizer, co-founder of the anti-militarist Code Pink
 Meg Beresford (born 1937) – British activist, European Nuclear Disarmament movement
 Daniel Berrigan (1921–2016) – American anti-Vietnam war protester, Jesuit (Catholic) priest, poet, author, anti-nuke and war
 Philip Berrigan (1923–2002) – American anti-Vietnam war protester, former Josephite (Catholic) priest, author, anti-nuke and war
 James Bevel (1936–2008) – American civil rights activist, anti-Vietnam war leader, organizer
 Vinoba Bhave (1895–1982) – Indian, Gandhian, teacher, author, organizer
 Albert Bigelow (1906–1993) – former US Navy officer turned pacifist, skipper of the first vessel to attempt disruption of the atmospheric testing of nuclear weapons
 Doris Blackburn (1889–1970) – Australian social reformer, politician, pacifist
 Janet Bloomfield (1953–2007) – British peace and disarmament campaigner, chair of the Campaign for Nuclear Disarmament
 Bhikkhu Bodhi (born 1944) – American Theravada Buddhist monk and founder of Buddhist Global Relief
 Kees Boeke (1884–1966) – Dutch educator, missionary and pacifist
 Beatrice Boeke-Cadbury (1884–1976) – English social activist, educator, Quaker missionary and pacifist
 Carl Bonnevie (1881–1972) – Norwegian jurist and peace activist
 Bono (born 1960) – Irish singer-songwriter, musician, venture capitalist, businessman, and philanthropist; born Paul David Hewson
 Charles-Auguste Bontemps (1893–1981) – French anarchist, pacifist, writer
 John Bosco (1815–1888) – Italian priest, educator and author, who devoted his life to disadvantaged youth; founded the Salesians of Don Bosco and developed the Salesian Preventive System of teaching
 Elise M. Boulding (1920–2010) – Norwegian-born American sociologist, specialising in academic peace research
 Albert Bourderon (1858–1930) – French socialist and pacifist
 José Bové (born 1953) – French farmer, politician, pacifist
 Norma Elizabeth Boyd (1888–1985) – African American politically active educator, children's rights proponent, pacifist
 Heloise Brainerd (1881–1969) – American women activist, pacifist
 Sophonisba Breckinridge (1866–1948) – American educator, social reformer, pacifist
 Lenni Brenner (born 1937) – American civil rights activist, opposed to the Vietnam war and strong opponent of Zionism
 Pierre Brizon (1878–1923) – French politician and pacifist
 Vera Brittain (1893–1970) – British writer, pacifist
 José Brocca (1891–1950) – Spanish activist, international delegate War Resisters' International, organiser of relief efforts during the Spanish Civil War
 Hugh Brock (1914–1985) – lifelong British pacifist and editor of Peace News between 1955 and 1964
 Peter Brock (1920–2006) – British-born Canadian pacifist historian
 Fenner Brockway (1888–1988) – British politician and Labour MP; humanist, pacifist and anti-imperialist; opposed conscription and founded the No-Conscription Fellowship in 1914; first chairperson of the War Resisters' International (1926–1934); founder member of the Campaign for Nuclear Disarmament and of the charity War on Want
 Emilia Broomé (1866–1925) – Swedish politician, feminist and peace activist
 Brigid Brophy (1929–1995) – British novelist, feminist, pacifist
 Olympia Brown (1835–1926) – American theologist, suffragist, pacifist
 Elihu Burritt (1810–1879) – American diplomat, social activist
 Caoimhe Butterly (born 1978) – Irish peace and human rights activist
 Charles Roden Buxton (1875–1942) – British Liberal and later Labour MP, philanthropist and peace activist, critical of the Treaty of Versailles

C

 Peter Ritchie Calder (1906–1982) – Scottish science journalist, socialist and peace activist
 Helen Caldicott (born 1938) – Australian physician, anti-nuclear activist, revived Physicians for Social Responsibility, campaigner against the dangers of radiation
 Hélder Câmara (1909–1999) – Brazilian archbishop, advocate of liberation theology, opponent of military dictatorship
 Lydia Canaan – Lebanese singer, first rock star of the Middle East, risked life to perform under military attack in protest of Lebanese Civil War
 Marcelle Capy (1891–1962), novelist, journalist, pacifist
 Angelo Cardona (born 1997), Colombian peace activist, pacifist
 Andrew Carnegie (1835–1919) – American industrialist and founder of the Carnegie Endowment for International Peace
 April Carter (born 1937) – British peace activist, researcher, editor
 Jimmy Carter (born 1924) – American negotiator and former US President, organizer, international conflict resolution
 René Cassin (1887–1976) – French jurist, professor, and judge, co-wrote the 1948 Universal Declaration of Human Rights
 Benny Cederfeld de Simonsen (1865–1952) – Danish peace activist
 Pierre Cérésole (1879–1945) – Swiss engineer, founder of Service Civil International (SCI) or International Voluntary Service for Peace (IVSP)
 Montserrat Cervera Rodon (born 1949) – Catalan anti-militarist, feminist, and women's health activist
 Félicien Challaye (1875–1967) – French philosopher and pacifist
 Émile Chartier (1868–1951) – French philosopher, educator and pacifist
 Simone Tanner Chaumet (1916–1962) – French peace activist
 Cesar Chavez (1927–1993) – American farm worker, labor leader and civil rights activist
 Helen Chenevix (1886–1963) – Irish suffragist, trade unionist, pacifist
 Ada Nield Chew (1870–1945) – British suffragist and pacifist
 Molly Childers (1875–1964) – Irish writer, nationalist, pacifist
 Noam Chomsky (born 1928) – American linguist, philosopher, and activist
 Alice Amelia Chown (1866–1949) – Canadian feminist, pacifist and writer
 Howard Clark (1950–2013) – British peace activist, deputy editor of Peace News and Chair of War Resisters' International.
 Ramsey Clark (1927–2021) – American anti-war and anti-nuclear lawyer, activist, former U.S. Attorney General
 Helena Cobban (born 1952) – British peace activist, journalist, author
 William Sloane Coffin (1924–2006) – American cleric, anti-war activist
 James Colaianni (1922–2016) – American author, publisher, first anti-Napalm organizer
 Judy Collins (born 1939) – American anti-war singer/songwriter, protester
 Alex Comfort (1920–2000) – British scientist, physician, writer, pacifist, conscientious objector and author of The Joy of Sex
 Alecu Constantinescu (1872–1949) – Romanian trade unionist, journalist and pacifist
 Jeremy Corbyn (born 1949) – British politician, socialist, long-time anti-war, anti-imperialism and anti-racism campaigner
 Tom Cornell – American anti-war activist, initiated first anti-Vietnam War protest
 Rachel Corrie (1979–2003) – American activist for Palestinian human rights
 David Cortright – American anti-nuclear weapon leader
 Norman Cousins (1915–1990) – American journalist, author, organizer, initiator
 Randal Cremer (1828–1908) – British trade unionist and Liberal MP (1885–1895, 1900–1908); pacifist; leading advocate for international arbitration; co-founded the Inter-Parliamentary Union and the International Arbitration League; promoted the Hague Peace Conferences of 1899 and 1907; awarded Nobel Peace Prize (1903)
 Frances Crowe (1919–2019) – American pacifist, anti-nuclear power activist, draft counselor supporting conscientious objectors
 Edvin Kanka Ćudić (born 1988) – Bosnian human rights and peace activist, founder and coordinator of Association for Social Research and Communications (UDIK)
 Adam Curle (1916–2006) – Quaker peace activist; first professor of peace studies in the UK

D

 Margaretta D'Arcy (born 1934) – Irish actress, writer and peace activist
 Mohammed Dajani Daoudi (born 1946) – Palestinian professor and peace activist
 Thora Daugaard (1874–1951) – Danish feminist, pacifist, journal editor and translator
 George Maitland Lloyd Davies (1880–1949) – Welsh pacifist and anti-war campaigner, chair of the Peace Pledge Union (1946–1949)
 Rennie Davis (1941–2021) – American anti-Vietnam war leader, organizer
 Dorothy Day (1897–1980) – American journalist, social activist, and co-founder of the Catholic Worker movement
 John Dear (born 1959) – American priest, author, and nonviolent activist
 Élisabeth Decrey Warner (born 1953) – Swiss peace activist, founder of Geneva Call
 Siri Derkert (1888–1973) – Swedish artist, pacifist and feminist
 David Dellinger (1915–2004) – American pacifist, organizer, anti-war leader
 Michael Denborough AM (1929–2014) – Australian medical researcher who founded the Nuclear Disarmament Party
 Dorothy Detzer (1893–1981) – American feminist, peace activist, U.S. secretary of the Women's International League for Peace and Freedom
 Amanda Deyo (1838–?) – American Universalist minister, peace activist, correspondent
 Mary Dingman (1875–1961) – American social and peace activist
 Alma Dolens (1876–?) – Italian pacifist and suffragist
 Frank Dorrel – American peace activist, publisher of Addicted to War
 W. E. B. Du Bois (1868–1963) – American socialist, historian, civil rights activist, peace activist and author
 Gabrielle Duchêne (1870–1954) – French feminist and pacifist
 Muriel Duckworth (1908–2009) – Canadian pacifist, feminist and community activist, founder of Nova Scotia Voice of Women for Peace
 Élie Ducommun (1833–1906) – Swiss pacifist and Nobel Peace Prize laureate
 Peggy Duff (1910–1981) – British peace activist, socialist, founder and first General Secretary of CND
 Henry Dunant (1828–1910) – Swiss businessman and social activist, founder of the Red Cross, and the joint first Nobel peace laureate (with Frédéric Passy)
 Roberta Dunbar (died 1956) – American clubwoman and peace activist
 Mel Duncan (born 1950) – American pacifist, founding Executive Director of Nonviolent Peaceforce
 B. D. Dykstra (1871–1955) – Dutch American pastor, writer, newspaper editor, and pacifist

E

 Crystal Eastman (1881–1928) – American lawyer, suffragist, pacifist, journalist, co-founder of ACLU
 Shirin Ebadi (born 1947) – Iranian lawyer, human rights activist, Nobel peace laureate
 Anna B. Eckstein (1868–1947) – German advocate of world peace
 Nikolaus Ehlen (1886–1965) – German pacifist teacher
 Hans Ehrenberg (1883–1958) – German Jewish philosopher and Christian theologian
 Albert Einstein (1879–1955) – German-born American scientist, Nobel Prize laureate in physics
 Daniel Ellsberg (born 1931) – American anti-war whistleblower, protester
 James Gareth Endicott (1898–1993) – Canadian missionary, initiator, organizer, protester
 Hedy Epstein (1924–2016) – Jewish-American antiwar activist, escaped Nazi Germany on the Kindertransport; active in opposition to Israeli military policies
 Dorothy Evans (1888–1944) – Hunger-striking British suffragette, secretary of Women's International League for Peace and Freedom
 Jodie Evans (born 1954) – American political activist, co-founder of Code Pink, initiator, organizer, filmmaker
 Maya Evans – British peace campaigner, arrested for reading out, near The Cenotaph, the names of British soldiers killed in Iraq

F
 Mildred Fahrni (1900–1992) – Canadian pacifist, feminist, internationally active in the peace movement
 Andrew Feinstein (born 1964) – South African activist against the arms trade; first member of the South African Parliament to introduce a motion on the Holocaust
 Michael Ferber (born 1944) – American author, professor, anti-war activist
 Benjamin Ferencz (born 1920) – American chief prosecutor at the Einsatzgruppen Trial
 Lawrence Ferlinghetti (1919–2021) – American poet, painter, peace and social activist
 Hermann Fernau (born 1883) – German lawyer, writer, journalist and pacifist
 Solange Fernex (1934–2006) – French peace activist and politician
 Beatrice Fihn (born 1982) – Swedish anti-nuclear activist, chairperson of International Campaign to Abolish Nuclear Weapons (ICAN)
 Genevieve Fiore (1912–2002) – American women's rights and peace activist
 Ingrid Fiskaa (born 1977) – Norwegian politician and peace activist
 Jane Fonda (born 1937) – American anti-war protester, actress
 Henni Forchhammer (1863–1955) – Danish educator, feminist and pacifist
 Jim Forest (1941–2022) – American author, international secretary of the Orthodox Peace Fellowship
 Randall Forsberg (1943–2007) – led a lifetime of research and advocacy on ways to reduce the risk of war, minimize the burden of military spending, and promote democratic institutions; career started at the Stockholm International Peace Research Institute in 1968
 Tom Fox (1951–2006) – American Quaker
 Diana Francis (born 1944) – British peace activist and scholar, former president of the International Fellowship of Reconciliation
 Ursula Franklin (1921–2016) – German-Canadian scientist, pacifist and feminist, whose research helped end atmospheric nuclear testing
 Marcia Freedman (born 1938) – American-Israeli peace activist, feminist and supporter of gay rights
 Comfort Freeman – Liberian anti-war activist
 Maikki Friberg (1861–1927) – Finnish educator, journal editor, suffragist and peace activist
 Alfred Fried (1864–1921) – co-founder of German peace movement, called for world peace organization

G

 Arun Manilal Gandhi (born 1934) – Indian, organizer, educator, grandson of Mohandas
 Mahatma Gandhi (1869–1948) – Indian, writer, organizer, protester, lawyer, inspiration to movement leaders
 Alfonso García Robles (1911–1991) – Mexican diplomat, the driving force behind the Treaty of Tlatelolco, setting up a nuclear-free zone in Latin America and the Caribbean. Awarded 1982 Nobel Peace Prize
 Eric Garris (born 1953) – American activist, founding webmaster of antiwar.com
 Martin Gauger (1905–1941) – German jurist and pacifist
 Leymah Gbowee (born 1972) – Liberian peace activist, organizer of women's peace movement in Liberia, awarded 2011 Nobel Peace Prize
 Aviv Geffen (born 1973) – Israeli singer and peace activist
 Everett Gendler (born 1928) – American conservative rabbi, peace activist, writer
 Olive Gibbs (1918–1995) – British politician, founding member of the Campaign for Nuclear Disarmament and second to serve as its chair, 1964–1967
 Allen Ginsberg (1926–1997) – American anti-war protester, writer, poet
 Igino Giordani (1894–1980) – Italian politician and cosponsor of the first Italian legislation on conscientious objection to military service, co-founder of the Catholic/ecumenical Focolare movement dedicated to unity and universal fraternity.
 Arthur Gish (1939–2010) – American public speaker and peace activist
 Bernie Glassman (1939–2018) – American Zen Buddhist roshi and founder of Zen Peacemakers
 Danny Glover (born 1946) – American actor and anti-war activist
 Vilma Glücklich (1872–1927) – Hungarian educator, pacifist and women's rights activist
 Emma Goldman (1869–1940) – Russian/American activist imprisoned in the U.S. for opposition to World War I
 Amy Goodman (born 1957) – American journalist, host of Democracy Now!
 Paul Goodman (1911–1972) – American writer, psychotherapist, social critic, anarchist philosopher and public intellectual
 Mikhail Gorbachev (1931–2022) – Russian anti-nuclear activist during and after Soviet presidency. In 1993 he launched Green Cross International and in 1995 initiated the World Summit of Nobel Peace Laureates.
 Jean Goss (1912–1991) – French non-violence activist
 Hildegard Goss-Mayr (born 1930) – Austrian pacifist and theologian
 Jonathan Granoff (born 1948) – Co-founder and President, Global Security Institute
 William Grassie (born 1957) – American nonviolence activist
 Jürgen Grässlin (born 1957) – teacher and activist against arms exports, especially of small arms (Heckler & Koch)
 Wavy Gravy (born 1936) – American entertainer and activist for peace
 Great Peacemaker – Native American co-founder of the Iroquois Confederacy, author Great Law of Peace
 Dick Gregory (1932–2017) – American comedian, anti-war protester
 Irene Greenwood (1898–1992) – Australian feminist, peace activist and broadcaster
 Richard Grelling (1853–1929) – German lawyer, writer and pacifist
 Ben Griffin (born 1977) – former British SAS soldier and Iraq War veteran
 Suze Groeneweg (1875–1940) – Dutch politician, feminist and pacifist
 Edward Grubb (1854–1939) – English Quaker, pacifist, active in the No-Conscription Fellowship
 Emil Grunzweig (1947–1983) – Israeli teacher and peace activist
 Gerson Gu-Konu, also Gerson Konu (1932–2006) – Peace and human rights activist from Togo
 J. Edward Guinan (1936–2014) – Founder of the Community for Creative Non-Violence
 Woody Guthrie (1912–1967) – American anti-war protester and musician, inspiration
 Tenzin Gyatso (born 1935) – 14th Dalai Lama of Tibet, Nobel Peace Prize laureate and spiritual and formerly temporal ruler of Tibet and the Tibetan Government-in-Exile

H

 Hugo Haase (1863–1919) – German socialist politician, jurist and pacifist
 Lucina Hagman (1853–1946) – Finnish feminist, politician, pacifist
 Otto Hahn (1879–1968) – German chemist, discoverer of nuclear fission, Nobel Laureate, pacifist, anti-nuclear weapons and testing advocate
 Jeanne Halbwachs (1890–1980), French pacifist, feminist and socialist
 Jeff Halper (born 1946) – American anthropologist and Israeli peace activist, founder of the Israeli Committee Against House Demolitions
 France Hamelin (1918–2007) – French artist, peace activist and resistance worker
 Eugénie Hamer (1865–after 1926) – Belgian peace activist and writer
 Judith Hand (born 1940) – American biologist, pioneer of peace ethology
 Cornelius Bernhard Hanssen (1864–1939) – Norwegian teacher, shipowner, politician and founder of the Norwegian Peace Association
 Eline Hansen (1859–1919) – Danish feminist and peace activist
 G. Simon Harak (born 1948) – American professor of theology, peace activist
 Keir Hardie (1856–1915) – Scottish socialist and pacifist, co-founder of Independent Labour Party and Labour Party, opposed WWI
 Florence Jaffray Harriman (1870–1967) – American suffragist, social reformer, pacifist and diplomat
 David Harris (1946–2023) – American anti-war organizer and draft resistance leader; later a journalist and author
 George Harrison (1943–2001) – English guitarist, singer, songwriter, and music and film producer, achieved international fame as the lead guitarist of The Beatles; religious and anti-war activist
 David Hartsough (born 1940) – American Quaker peace activist
 Marii Hasegawa (1918–2012) – Japanese peace activist and president (1971–1975) of the Women's International League for Peace and Freedom
 Václav Havel (1936–2011) – Czech nonviolent writer, poet, and politician
 Brian Haw (1949–2011) – British activist, initiated and long time participant of the Parliament Square Peace Campaign
 Tom Hayden (1939–2016) – American civil rights activist, anti-Vietnam war leader, author, California politician
 Wilson A. Head (1914–1993) – American/Canadian sociologist, activist
 Fredrik Heffermehl (born 1938) – Norwegian jurist, writer and peace activist
 Idy Hegnauer (1909–2006) – Swiss nurse and peace activist
 Estrid Hein (1873–1956) – Danish ophthalmologist, women's rights activist and pacifist
 Arthur Henderson (1863–1935) – British politician, Labour Party leader, Foreign Secretary, chair of the Geneva Disarmament Conference, Nobel Peace Prize 1934
 Ammon Hennacy (1893–1970) – American Christian pacifist, anarchist and social activist
 Yella Hertzka (1873–1948) – Austrian peace and women's rights activist
 Abraham Joshua Heschel (1907–1972) – Polish-born American rabbi, professor at Jewish Theological Seminary, civil rights and peace activist
 Bono (born 1960) – Irish singer-songwriter, musician, venture capitalist, businessman, and philanthropist; born Paul David Hewson
 Paul David Hewson (born 1960) – Irish singer-songwriter; see Bono above
 Hiawatha (1525–?) – Native American co-founder of the Iroguois League and co-author of the Great Law of Peace
 Sidney Hinkes (1925–2006) – British pacifist and Anglican priest
 Raichō Hiratsuka (1886–1971) – Japanese writer, political activist, feminist and pacifist
 Unutea Hirshon (born 1947) – French Polynesian anti-nuclear activist
 Emily Hobhouse (1860–1926) – British welfare campaigner, pacifist, and anti-war activist, publicly denounced the existence of the British concentration camps in South Africa
 Abbie Hoffman (1936–1989) – American anti-Vietnam war leader, co-founder of Yippies
 Ann-Margret Holmgren (1850–1940) – Swedish writer, feminist, and pacifist
 Margaret Holmes, AM (1909–2009) – Australian activist during the Vietnam War, member Anglican Pacifist Fellowship
 Inger Holmlund (1927–2019), Swedish anti-nuclear activist
 Alec Horsley (1902–1993) – British Quaker businessman, founder of the company which became Northern Foods, member of the Common Wealth Party, the Committee of 100, founding member of CND
 Ellen Hørup (1871–1953) – Danish writer, pacifist, and women's rights activist
 Nobuto Hosaka (born 1955) – Japanese politician, mayor of Setagaya in Tokyo; campaigned and won the mayor's job on an anti-nuclear platform in April 2011, just over a month after the Fukushima Daiichi nuclear disaster
 Julia Ward Howe (1819–1910) – American writer, social activist, peace advocate, author of the Mother's Day Proclamation
 Helmuth Hübener (1925–1942) – executed at the age of 17 in Nazi Germany for distributing anti-war leaflets
 Kate Hudson (born 1958) – British left-wing political activist and academic; General Secretary of the Campaign for Nuclear Disarmament (CND) and National Secretary of Left Unity; officer of the Stop the War Coalition since 2002
 Jessie Wallace Hughan (1875–1955) – founder of the War Resisters League; socialist and radical pacifist
 Emrys Hughes (1894–1969) – Welsh socialist member of the British Parliament, where he was an outspoken pacifist
 Laura Hughes (1886–1966) – Canadian feminist and pacifist
 Hannah Clothier Hull (1872–1958) – American Quaker activist, in the leadership of WILPF in the US
 John Hume (1937–2020) – Irish Nobel Peace Prize and Gandhi Peace Prize recipient, former leader of the Social Democratic and Labour Party, and former MP for Foyle 1983–2005
 John Peters Humphrey (1905–1995) – Canadian scholar, jurist, and human rights advocate, wrote the first draft of the Universal Declaration of Human Rights
 Aldous Huxley (1894–1963) – English pacifist, anti-war and anti-conflict writer

I

 Miguel Giménez Igualada (1888–1973) – Spanish anarchist, writer, pacifist
 Daisaku Ikeda (born 1928) – Japanese Buddhist leader, writer, president of Soka Gakkai International, and founder of multiple educational and peace research institutions
 Kathleen Innes (1883–1967) – British educator, writer, pacifist

J
 Berthold Jacob (1898–1944) – German journalist and pacifist
 Aletta Jacobs (1854–1929) – Dutch physician, feminist and peace activist
 Martha Larsen Jahn (1875–1954) – Norwegian peace activist and feminist
 Jean Jaurès (1859–1914) – French anti-war activist, socialist leader
 Kirthi Jayakumar (born 1987) – Indian peace activist and gender equality activist, youth peace activist, peace educator and founder of The Red Elephant Foundation
 Zorica Jevremović (born 1948) – Serbian playwright, theatre director, peace activist
 Jigonhsasee, co-founder, along with The Great Peacemaker and Hiawatha, of the Iroquois Confederacy, she became known as the Mother of Nations among the Iroquois.
 Tano Jōdai (1886–1982) – Japanese English literature professor, peace activist and university president
 John Paul II (1920–2005) – Polish Catholic pope, inspiration, advocate
 Helen John (1937–2017) – British activist, one of the first full-time members of the Greenham Common peace camp
 Hagbard Jonassen (1903–1977) – Danish botanist and peace activist
 Alice Jouenne (1873–1954), French educator and socialist activist
 Terasawa Junsei (born 1950), Japanese Buddhist monk and peace activist

K

 Ekaterina Karavelova (1860–1947) – Bulgarian educator, writer, suffragist, feminist, pacifist
 Tawakkol Karman (born 1979) – Yemeni journalist, politician and human rights activist; shared 2011 Nobel Peace prize
 Helena Kekkonen (1926–2014), Finnish peace activist and peace educator
 Helen Keller (1880–1968) – American activist, deafblind writer, speech "Strike Against The War" Carnegie Hall, New York 1916
 Kathy Kelly (born 1952) – American peace and anti-war activist, arrested over 60 times during protests; member and organizer of international peace teams
 Petra Kelly (1947–1992) – German politician, feminist, pacifist
 Bruce Kent (1929–2022) – British political activist, former Catholic priest; anti-nuclear campaigner with the Campaign for Nuclear Disarmament (CND) and president of the International Peace Bureau
 Khan Abdul Ghaffar Khan (1890–1988) – Pashtun independence activist, spiritual and political leader, lifelong pacifist
 Wahiduddin Khan (1925–2021) – Indian Islamic scholar and peace activist
 Abraham Yehudah Khein (1878–1957) – Ukrainian rabbi, essayist, pacifist
 Steve Killelea – initiated Global Peace Index and Institute for Economics and Peace
 Coretta Scott King (1927–2006) – American author, civil rights leader, and active in the anti-Vietnam war movement
 Martin Luther King Jr. (1929–1968) – Civil rights leader, American anti-Vietnam war protester
 Anna Kleman (1862–1940) – Swedish suffragist and peace activist
 Michael D. Knox (born 1946) – founder of US Peace Memorial Foundation, antiwar activist, psychologist, professor
 Adam Kokesh (born 1982) – American activist, Iraq Veterans Against the War
 Annette Kolb (1870–1967) – German writer and pacifist
 Ron Kovic (born 1946) – American Vietnam war veteran, war protester
 Paul Krassner (1932–2019) – American anti-Vietnam war organizer, writer, Yippie co-founder
 Dennis Kucinich (born 1946) – former U.S. Representative from Ohio, advocate for US Department of Peace

L

 Henri La Fontaine (1854–1943) – Belgian initiator, organizer, Nobel Peace Prize winner
 Léonie La Fontaine (1857–1949) – Belgian feminist and pacifist
 William Ladd (1778–1841) – early American activist, initiator, first president of the American Peace Society
 Benjamin Ladraa (born 1982) – Swedish activist
 Bernard Lafayette (born 1940) – American organizer, educator, initiator
 Maurice Laisant (1909–1991) – French anarchist and pacifist
 George Lakey (born 1937) – American peace activist, co-founder of the Movement for a New Society
 Grigoris Lambrakis (1912–1963) – Greek athlete, physician, politician, activist
 Gustav Landauer (1870–1919) – German writer, anarchist, pacifist
 Lanza del Vasto (1901–1981) – Italian Gandhian, philosopher, poet, nonviolent activist
 Christian Lous Lange (1869–1938) – Norwegian historian and pacifist
 Alexander Langer (1946–1995) – Italian journalist, peace activist and politician
 George Lansbury (1859–1940) – British politician and Christian pacifist; Labour Party Leader (1932–1935); campaigner for social justice and women's rights and against imperialism; opposed WW1; campaigned for disarmament in the 1920s and 1930s; president of the Peace Pledge Union (1937)
 André Larivière (born 1948) – Canadian ecologist and anti-nuclear activist
 Bryan Law (1954–2013) – Australian non-violent activist
 Louis Lecoin (1888–1971) – French anarchist and pacifist
 Urbain Ledoux (1874–1941) – American Baháʼí diplomat and activist
 John Lennon (1940–1980) – British singer/songwriter, anti-war protester
 Sidney Lens (1912–1986) – American anti-Vietnam war leader
 Muriel Lester (1885–1968) – British social reformer, pacifist and nonconformist; Ambassador and Secretary for the International Fellowship of Reconciliation; co-founder of the Kingsley Hall
 Captain Howard Levy – Army Captain sent to Leavenworth Military Prison for over two years for refusing an order to train Green Beret medics on their way to Vietnam.
 Bertie Lewis (1920–2010) – RAF airman who went on to become a U.K. peace campaigner
 Thomas Lewis (1940–2008) – American artist, anti-war activist with (Baltimore Four and Catonsville Nine)
 Bart de Ligt (1883–1938) – Dutch anarchist, pacifist and antimilitarist
 Lola Maverick Lloyd (1875–1944) – American pacifist, suffragist, feminist
 Gabriele Moreno Locatelli (1959–1993) – Italian pacifist
 Grace Lolim (fl. 2000) – Kenyan human rights and peace activist
 James Loney (born 1964) – Canadian peace worker, kidnap victim
 Isabel Longworth (1881–1961) – Australian dentist and peace activist
 Lee Lorch (1915–2014) – Canadian mathematician and peace activist
 Fernand Loriot (1870–1932) – French teacher and pacifist
 Lowkey (born 1986) – British rapper and peace activist; opposed to the invasion of Iraq and US/UK foreign policy more generally
 David Loy (born 1947) – American scholar, author and Sanbo Kyodan Zen Buddhist teacher
 Chiara Lubich (1920–2008) – Italian Catholic mystic and founder of Focolare movement, advocate of unity amongst Christians, interreligious dialogue and cooperative relations between religious and non-religious people. Promoted "universal fraternity".
 Rae Luckock (1893–1972) – Canadian feminist, peace activist and politician
 Sigrid Helliesen Lund (1892–1987) – Norwegian peace activist
 Rosa Luxemburg (1871–1919) – German Marxist and anti–war activist
 Jake Lynch (born 1964) – peace journalist, academic and writer
 Staughton Lynd (born 1929) – American anti-Vietnam war leader
 Bradford Lyttle (born 1927) – American pacifist, writer, presidential candidate, and organizer with the Committee for Non-Violent Action

M

 Wangari Maathai (1940–2011) – Kenyan environmental activist, Nobel peace laureate
 Chrystal Macmillan (1872–1937) – Scottish politician, feminist, pacifist
 Salvador de Madariaga (1886–1978) – Spanish diplomat, historian and pacifist
 Carmen Magallón (born 1951) – Spanish physicist, pacifist, conducting research in support of women's advancement in science and peace
 Norman Mailer (1923–2007) – American anti-war writer, war protester
 Mairead Maguire (born 1944) – Northern Ireland peace movement, Nobel peace laureate
 Nelson Mandela (1918–2013) – South African statesman, leader in the anti-apartheid movement and post-apartheid reconciliation, founder of The Elders, inspiration
 Rosa Manus (1881–1942) – Dutch pacifist and suffragist
 Bob Marley (1945–1981) – Jamaican, inspirational anti-war singer/songwriter, inspiration
 Jacques Martin (1906–2001) – French pacifist and Protestant pastor
 Elizabeth McAlister (born 1939) – American former nun, peace activist, and co-founder of Jonah House
 Colman McCarthy (born 1938) – American journalist, teacher, lecturer, pacifist, progressive, anarchist, and long-time peace activist
 Eugene McCarthy (1916–2005) – U.S. presidential candidate, ran on an anti-Vietnam war agenda
 John McConnell (1915–2012) – American peace activist, creator of Earth Day
 George McGovern (1922–2012) – U.S. Senator, presidential candidate, anti-Vietnam war agenda
 Keith McHenry (born 1957) – American co-founder of Food Not Bombs
 David McReynolds (1929–2018) – leader in U.S. War Resisters League for 40 years, chair of War Resisters' International, organizer of major national anti-Vietnam War demonstrations
 David McTaggart (1932–2001) – Canadian activist against nuclear weapons testing, co-founder Greenpeace International
 Monica McWilliams (born 1954) – Northern Irish academic, peace activist, human rights defender and former politician. She was delegate at the Multi-Party Peace Negotiations, which led to the Good Friday Peace Agreement in 1998.
 Jeanne Mélin (1877–1964) – French pacifist, feminist, writer, and politician
 Adrienne van Melle-Hermans (1931–2007) – Dutch anti-nuclear peace activist, also active in ex-Yugoslavia
 Marjorie Bradford Melville (born 1929) – Member of the Catonsville Nine
 Rigoberta Menchú (born 1959) – Guatemalan indigenous rights advocate, anti-war activist, and co-founder of Nobel Women's Initiative
 Chico Mendes (1944–1988) – Brazilian environmentalist, trade union leader, and human rights advocate of peasants and indigenous peoples; assassinated in 1988
 Frank Merrick (1886–1981) – English composer, pianist, conscientious objector
 Thomas Merton (1915–1968) – American Trappist monk and poet, inspirational writer, philosopher
 Johanne Meyer (1838–1915) – pioneering Danish suffragist, pacifist, and journal editor
 Karl Meyer (born 1937) – American pacifist and tax resister
 Selma Meyer (1890–1941) – Dutch pacifist and resistance fighter of Jewish origin
 Fred Mfuranzima (born 1997) – Rwandan writer, peace activist
 Kizito Mihigo (1981–2020) – Rwandan Christian singer; genocide survivor; dedicated to forgiveness, peace and reconciliation after the 1994 genocide
 Olga Misař (1876–1950) – Austrian peace activist and writer
 Barry Mitcalfe (1930–1986) – a leader of the New Zealand movement against the Vietnam War and the New Zealand anti-nuclear movement
 Malebogo Molefhe (born 1980) – Botswanan activist against gender-based violence
 Eva Moltesen (1871–1934) – Finnish-Danish writer and peace activist
 Roger Monclin (1903–1985) – French pacifist and anarchist
 Agda Montelius (1850–1920) – Swedish philanthropist, feminist and peace activist
 E. D. Morel (1873–1924) – British journalist, author, pacifist and politician; opposed the First World War and campaigned against slavery in the Congo
 Simonne Monet-Chartrand (1919–1993) – Canadian women's rights activist, feminist, and pacifist
 Howard Morland (born 1942) – American journalist, nuclear weapons abolitionist
 Sybil Morrison (1893–1984) – British pacifist active in the Peace Pledge Union
 Émilie de Morsier (1843–1896) – Swiss feminist, pacifist and abolitionist
 John Mott (1865–1955) – American evangelist, leader of the YMCA and WSCF, 1946 Nobel peace laureate
 Bobby Muller (born 1946) – Vietnam vet and driving force behind campaign to ban landmines, 1997 Nobel Peace Prize
 Alaa Murabit (born 1989) – Libyan Canadian physician and human rights advocate for inclusive peace and security
 Craig Murray (born 1958) – British former diplomat turned whistleblower, human rights activist and anti-war campaigner
 John Middleton Murry (1889–1957) – British author, sponsor of the Peace Pledge Union, and editor of Peace News 1940–1946
 A. J. Muste (1885–1967) – American pacifist, organizer, anti-Vietnam War leader

N

 Ottfried Nassauer (1956–2020) – German journalist and researcher, activist for arms control and against arms exports
 Abie Nathan (1927–2008) – Israeli humanitarian, founded Voice of Peace radio, met with all sides of a conflict
 Ezra Nawi (1952–2021) – Israeli human rights activist and pacifist
 Paul Newman (1925–2008) – American anti-war protester, actor
 Gabriela Ngirmang (1922–2007) – Palauan peace and anti-nuclear activist
 Elizabeth Pease Nichol (1807–1897) – suffragist, chartist, abolitionist, anti-vivisectionist, member of the Peace Society
 Georg Friedrich Nicolai (1874–1964) – German professor, famous for the book The Biology of War
 Martin Niemöller (1892–1984) – German anti-Nazi Lutheran pastor, imprisoned in Sachsenhausen and Dachau, vocal pacifist and campaigner for disarmament
Anna T. Nilsson (1869–1947) – Swedish educator and peace activist
 Philip Noel-Baker (1889–1982) – British Labour Party politician, Olympic silver medallist, active campaigner for disarmament, Nobel Peace Prize 1959, co-founder with Fenner Brockway of the World Disarmament Campaign
 Louise Nørlund (1854–1919) – Danish feminist and peace activist
 Sari Nusseibeh (born 1949) – Palestinian activist

O

 Phil Ochs (1940–1976) – American anti-Vietnam war singer/songwriter, initiated protest events
 Paul Oestreich (1878–1959) – German educator, board member of the "German Peace Society" in 1921– 1926
 Paul Oestreicher (born 1931) – German-born British human rights activist, Canon emeritus of Coventry Cathedral, Christian pacifist, active in post-war reconciliation
 Yoko Ono (born 1933) – Japanese anti-Vietnam war campaigner in America and Europe
 Ciaron O'Reilly (born 1960) – Australian pacifist, anti-war activist, Catholic Worker, served prison time in America and Ireland for disarming war material
 Carl von Ossietzky (1889–1938) – German pacifist, Nobel peace laureate, the opponent of Nazi rearmament
 Geoffrey Ostergaard (1926–1990) – British political scientist, academic, writer, anarchist, pacifist
 Laurence Overmire (born 1957) – American poet, author, theorist

P

 Olof Palme (1927–1986) – Swedish prime minister, diplomat
 Ellen Palmstierna (1869–1941) – Swedish women's rights and peace activist
 Marian Cripps, Baroness Parmoor (1878–1952) – British anti-war activist
 Medha Patkar (born 1954) – Indian activist for Tribals and Dalits affected by dam projects
 Frédéric Passy (1822–1912) – French economist, peace activist and joint recipient (together with Henry Dunant) of the first Nobel Peace Prize (1901)
 Ron Paul (born 1935) – American author, physician, former U.S. congressman and Presidential candidate, anti-war activist, libertarian Republican
 Ava Helen Pauling (1903–1981) – American human rights activist, feminist, pacifist
 Linus Pauling (1901–1994) – American anti-nuclear testing advocate and leader
 James Peck (1914–1993) – American anti-war and civil rights activist; advocate of nonviolent civil disobedience
 Priscilla Hannah Peckover (1833–1931) – English pacifist, nominated four times for the Nobel Peace Prize
 Mattityahu Peled (1923–1995) – Israeli scholar, officer and peace activist
 Miko Peled (born 1961) – Israeli peace activist, author of the book The General's Son: Journey of an Israeli in Palestine
 Lindis Percy (born 1941) – British nurse, midwife, pacifist, founder of the Campaign for the Accountability of American Bases (CAAB)
 Gabrielle Petit (feminist) (1860–1952) – French feminist activist, anticlerical, libertarian socialist, newspaper editor
 Ann Pettitt (born 1947) – co-founder of Greenham Common Women's Peace Camp
 Concepción Picciotto (born 1945?) – Spanish-born anti-nuclear and anti-war protester, White House Peace Vigil
 Abbé Pierre (1912–2007) – French priest, founder of the Emmaus movement
 Peace Pilgrim (1908–1981) – American activist, walked the highways and streets of America promoting peace
 Amparo Poch y Gascón (1902–1968) – Spanish anarchist, pacifist and physician
 Ronald Podrow (1926–2004) – American pacifist and peace activist
 Paula Pogány (1884–1982) – Hungarian peace activist, suffragist, and conditioning/strength coach
 Maria Pognon (1844–1925) – French writer, feminist, suffragist and pacifist
 Joseph Polowsky (1916–1983) – American GI, advocate of better relations between the U.S. and Soviet Union between 1955 and 1983
 Pomnyun Sunim (born 1952) – South Korean author, peace activist, YouTuber
 Willemijn Posthumus-van der Goot (1897–1989) – Dutch economist, feminist, pacifist
 Vasily Pozdnyakov (1869–1921) – Russian conscientious objector and writer
 Manasi Pradhan (born 1962) – Indian activist; founder of Honour for Women National Campaign
 Devi Prasad (1921–2011) – Indian activist and artist
 Harriet Dunlop Prenter (1865 or 1856–1939) – Canadian feminist, pacifist
 Christoph Probst (1919–1943) – German pacifist and member of the anti-Nazi White Rose resistance

Q
 Ludwig Quidde (1858–1941) – German pacifist, 1927 Nobel peace laureate

R

 Jim Radford (1928–2020) – British social, political and peace activist, Britain's youngest D-Day veteran, folk singer and co-organiser of the first Aldermaston March in 1958
 Gabrielle Radziwill (1877–1968) – Lithuanian pacifist, feminist and League of Nations official
 Clara Ragaz (1874–1957) – Swiss pacifist and feminist
 Abdullah Abu Rahmah – Palestinian peace activist
 Milan Rai (born 1965) – British writer and anti-war activist
 Justin Raimondo (born 1951) – American author, anti-war activist, founder of Antiwar.com
 Cornelia Ramondt-Hirschmann (1871–1957) – Dutch teacher, feminist and pacifist
 José Ramos-Horta (born 1949) – East Timorese politician, head of the United Nations Integrated Peacebuilding Office in Guinea-Bissau, Nobel peace laureate
 Michael Randle (born 1933) – British peace activist and co-organiser of the first Aldermaston March
 Darrell Rankin (born 1957) – Canadian peace activist and Communist politician
 Jeannette Rankin (1880–1973) – first woman elected to the U.S. Congress, lifelong pacifist
 Marcus Raskin (1934–2017) – American social critic, opponent of the Vietnam war and the draft
 Dahlia Ravikovitch (1936–2005) – Israeli poet and peace activist
 Betty Reardon (1929) – founder and director of the Peace Education Center and Peace Education Graduate Degree Program at Teachers College, Columbia University
 Madeleine Rees (fl. from 1990s) – British lawyer, human right and peace proponent
 Ernie Regehr – Canadian peace researcher
 Eugen Relgis (1865–1987) – Romanian writer, pacifist and anarchist
 Patrick Reinsborough (born 1972) – American anti-war activist and author
 Maixux Rekalde (1934–2022) – Spanish Basque pacifist, activist, and journalist
 Megan Rice SHCJ (1930–2021) – Sister of the Holy Child and antinuclear disarmament activist
 Henry Richard (1812–1888) – Welsh Congregationalist minister and Member of Parliament (1868–1888), known as "the Apostle of Peace" / "Apostol Heddwch", advocate of international arbitration, secretary of the Peace Society for forty years (1848–1884)
 Lewis Fry Richardson (1881–1953) – English mathematician, physicist, pacifist, pioneer of modern mathematical techniques of weather forecasting and their application to studying the causes of war and how to prevent them
 Renate Riemeck (1920–2003) – German historian and Christian peace activist
 Ellen Robinson (1840–1912) – British peace campaigner
 Julian Perry Robinson (1941–2020) – British peace researcher
 Adi Roche (born 1955) – Irish activist, chief executive of the charity Chernobyl Children International
 Douglas Roche (1929) – Canadian author, parliamentarian, diplomat, and peace activist
 Nicholas Roerich (1874–1947) – Russian visionary artist and mystic, creator of the Roerich Pact and Nobel Peace Prize candidate
 Amelia Rokotuivuna (1941–2005) – Fijian opponent of French nuclear tests in the Pacific
 Madeleine Rolland (1872–1960) – French translator and peace activist; sister of Romain Rolland
 Romain Rolland (1866–1944) – French dramatist, novelist, essayist, anti-war activist
 Óscar Romero (1917–1980) – Venerable Archbishop of San Salvador
 Eleanor Roosevelt (1884–1962) – American pacifist, organized the 1948 United Nations' Universal Declaration of Human Rights, first Gandhi Peace Award winner
 Martha Root (1872–1939) – American Baháʼí traveling teacher
 Eugen Rosenstock-Huessy (1888–1973) – historian and social philosopher, whose work spanned the disciplines of history, theology, sociology, linguistics and beyond
 Franz Rosenzweig (1886–1929) – German Jewish theologian (rabi) and philosopher
 Murray Rothbard (1926–1995) – American author, political theorist, historian, staunch opponent of military interventions
 Elisabeth Rotten (1882–1964) – German-born Swiss peace activist and education reformer
 Coleen Rowley (born 1954) – ex-FBI agent, whistleblower, peace activist, and the first recipient of the Sam Adams Award
 Arundhati Roy (born 1961) – Indian writer, social critic and peace activist
 Jerry Rubin (1938–1994) – American anti-Vietnam war leader, co-founder of the Yippies
 Hagar Rublev (1954–2000) – Israeli peace activist, founder of Women in Black
 Otto Rühle (1874–1943) – German Marxist and pacifist
 Bertrand Russell (1872–1970) – British philosopher, logician, mathematician, outspoken advocate of nuclear disarmament
 Han Ryner (1861–1938) – French anarchist philosopher, pacifist

S

 Carl Sagan (1934–1996) – American astronomer, opposed escalation of the nuclear arms race
 Mohamed Sahnoun (1931–2018) – Algerian diplomat, peace activist, UN envoy to Somalia and to the Great Lakes region of Africa
 Edward Said (1935–2003) – Palestinian-American academic and cultural critic, joint founder with Daniel Barenboim of the West–Eastern Divan Orchestra
 Avril de Sainte-Croix (1855–1939) – French feminist, pacifist and writer
 Andrei Sakharov (1921–1989) – Russian nuclear physicist, human rights activist, and pacifist
 Ada Salter (1866–1942) – English Quaker and pacifist, a founding member of Women's International League for Peace and Freedom
 Ed Sanders (born 1939) – American poet, organizer and singer, co-founder of anti-war band The Fugs
 Teresa Sarti Strada (1946–2009) – Italian teacher, pacifist and philanthropist who co-founded the NGO Emergency
 Mark Satin (born 1946) – American political theorist, anti-war proponent, draft-resistance organizer, philosopher, and writer
 Gerd Grønvold Saue (born 1930) – Norwegian writer and peace activist
 Jean-René Saulière (1911–1999) – French anarchist and pacifist
 Henriette Sauret (1890–1976) – French feminist, author, pacifist, journalist
 Jonathan Schell (1943–2014) – American writer and campaigner against nuclear weapons, anti-war activist
 Sophie Scholl (1921–1943) – German student and Christian pacifist, active in the White Rose non-violent resistance movement in Nazi Germany
 Albert Schweitzer (1875–1965) – German-French activist against nuclear weapons and nuclear weapon testing whose speeches were published as Peace or Atomic War; co-founder of The Committee for a Sane Nuclear Policy
 Kailash Satyarthi (born 1954) – child activist, Bachpan Bachao Aandolan, Nobel Peace Prize
 Rosika Schwimmer (1877–1948) – Hungarian feminist, pacifist and suffragist
 Molly Scott Cato (born 1963) – British green economist, Green Party politician, pacifist, and anti-nuclear campaigner
 Pete Seeger (1919–2014) – American singer, anti-war protester and inspirational singer/songwriter
 Margarethe Lenore Selenka (1860–1922) – German zoologist, feminist, and pacifist
 Ravi Shankar (born 1956) – Indian spiritual teacher, humanitarian leader, and ambassador of peace
 Jeff Sharlet (1942–1969) – American journalist and anti-Vietnam war soldier
 Gene Sharp (1928–2018) – American writer on non-violent resistance, founder of the Albert Einstein Institution
 H. James Shea Jr. (1939–1970) – American politician and anti-Vietnam War activist
 Cindy Sheehan (born 1957) – American anti-Iraq and anti-Afghanistan war leader
 Francis Sheehy-Skeffington (1878–1916) – Irish feminist, peace activist and writer
 Martin Sheen (born 1940) – American anti-war and anti-nuclear bomb protester, inspirational actor
 Nancy Shelley OAM (died 2010) – Quaker who represented the Australian peace movement at the UN in 1982
 Percy Bysshe Shelley (1792–1822) – English Romantic poet, non-violent philosopher, and inspiration
 Dick Sheppard (1880–1937) – Anglican priest and Christian pacifist, started the Peace Pledge Union
 David Dean Shulman (born 1949) – American indologist, humanist, peace activist and defender of Palestinian human rights
 Friedrich Siegmund-Schultze (1885–1969) – German theologian and pacifist
 Toma Sik (1939–2004) – Hungarian-Israeli peace activist
 Jeanmarie Simpson (born 1959) – American feminist and peace activist
 Ramjee Singh (born 1927) – Indian activist, philosopher, and Gandhian
 Ellen Johnson Sirleaf (born 1938) – President of Liberia, shared 2011 Nobel Peace Prize with Tawakkol Karman and Leymah Gbowee in recognition of "their non-violent struggle for the safety of women and for women's rights to full participation in peace-building work"
 Sulak Sivaraksa (born 1932) – Thai writer and engaged Buddhist activist
 Samantha Smith (1972–1985) – American schoolgirl, young advocate of peace between Soviets and Americans
 Julia Solly (1862–1953) – British-born South African suffragist, feminist and pacifist
 Miriam Soljak (1879–1971) – New Zealand feminist, communist, unemployed-rights activist and pacifist
 Myrtle Solomon (1921–1987) – British General Secretary of the Peace Pledge Union and Chair of War Resisters' International
 Cornelio Sommaruga (born 1932) – Swiss diplomat, president of the ICRC (1987–1999), founding President of Initiatives of Change International
 Donald Soper (1903–1998) – British Methodist minister, president of the Fellowship of Reconciliation and active in the CND
 Benjamin Spock (1903–1998) – American pediatrician, anti-Vietnam war protester, writer, inspiration
 Hope Squire (1878–1936) – British composer, pianist, and activist
 Helene Stähelin (1891–1970) – Swiss mathematician and peace activist
 Ringo Starr (born 1940) – British singer-songwriter, member of The Beatles
 Helen Steven (1942–2016) – Scottish Quaker and co-founder of the Scottish Centre for Nonviolence
 Cat Stevens (born 1948) – British singer-songwriter, convert to Islam, and humanitarian
 Lilian Stevenson (1870–1960) – Irish peace activist and historiographer
 Joffre Stewart (1925–2019) – American poet, anarchist, and pacifist
 Frances Benedict Stewart (fl. 1920s–1950s) – Chilean-born American sociologist, pacifist, feminist and Baháʼí Faith pioneer
 Gino Strada (1948–2021) – Italian surgeon, anti-war activist, human rights activist, and founder of Emergency
 David Swanson (born 1969) – American anti-war activist, blogger and author
 Ivan Supek (1915–2007) – Croatian physicist, philosopher, peace activist and writer
 Bertha von Suttner (1843–1914) – Czech-Austrian pacifist, first woman Nobel peace laureate
 Helena Swanwick (1864–1939) – British feminist and pacifist
 Irma Szirmai (1867–1958) - Hungarian feminist and pacifist

T

 Kathleen Tacchi-Morris (1899–1993) – British dancer, founder of Women for World Disarmament
 Tamanend (c. 1625–c. 1701) – known as a lover of peace and friendship, the Chief of Chiefs and Chief of the Turtle Clan of the Lenni-Lenape nation in the Delaware Valley signed the Peace Treaty with William Penn
 Guri Tambs-Lyche (1917–2008) – Norwegian women's rights activist and pacifist
 Tank Man – Stood in front of the tank during 1989 China protest
 Peter Tatchell (born 1952) – Australian-born British LGBT and human rights campaigner, founder of Christians for Peace
 Eve Tetaz (born 1931) – retired American teacher, peace and justice activist
 Thích Nhất Hạnh (1926–2022) – Vietnamese Thiền Buddhist monk, peace activist, and inspirator of engaged Buddhism
 Jean-Marie Tjibaou (1936–1989) – Activist for the New Caledonia movement
 Thomas (1947–2009) – American anti-nuclear activist, White House peace vigil
 Ellen Thomas (born 1947) – American peace activist, White House peace vigil
 Helen Thomas (1966–1989) – Welsh peace activist who died after being hit by a police vehicle at the Greenham Common Women's Peace Camp
 Dorothy Thompson (1923–2011) – English historian and peace activist
 Henry David Thoreau (1817–1862) – American writer, philosopher, inspiration to movement leaders
 Sybil Thorndike (1882–1976) – British actress and pacifist; member of the Peace Pledge Union who gave readings for its benefit
 Setsuko Thurlow (born 1932) – Japanese-Canadian non-nuclear weapon activist, figure of International Campaign to Abolish Nuclear Weapons (ICAN)
 Leo Tolstoy (1828–1910) – Russian writer on nonviolence, inspiration to Gandhi, Bevel, and other movement leaders
 Aya Virginie Touré – Ivorian peace activist, proponent of non-violent resistance
 Jakow Trachtenberg (1888–1953) – Russian engineer and pacifist
 André Trocmé (1901–1971), with his wife Italian-born Magda (1901–1996) – French Protestant pacifist pastor, saved many Jews in Vichy France
 Benjamin Franklin Trueblood (1847–1916) – 19th century American writer, editor, organizer, pacifist, active in the American Peace Society
 Barbara Grace Tucker – Australian born peace activist, long time participant of the Parliament Square Peace Campaign
 Titia van der Tuuk (1854–1939) – Dutch feminist and pacifist
 Desmond Tutu (1931–2021) – South African cleric, initiator, anti-apartheid
 Clara Tybjerg (1864–1941) – Danish feminist, peace activist and educator

U
 Evelyn Underhill (1875–1941) – English Anglo-Catholic writer and pacifist

V

 Jo Vallentine (born 1946) – Australian politician and peace activist
 Alfred Vanderpol (1854–1915) – French engineer, pacifist and writer
 Mordechai Vanunu (born 1954) – Israeli whistleblower
 Krista van Velzen (born 1974) – Dutch politician, pacifist and antimilitarist
 Madeleine Vernet (1878–1949) – French educator, writer and pacifist
 Llorenç Vidal Vidal (born 1936) – Spanish poet, educator and pacifist
 Stellan Vinthagen (born 1964) – Swedish anti-war and nonviolent resistance scholar-activist
 Louis Vitale (born 1932) – American anti-war activist and Franciscan friar
 Bruno Vogel (1898–1987) – German pacifist and writer
 Kurt Vonnegut (1922–2007) – American anti-war and anti-nuclear writer and protester

W

 Lillian Wald (1867–1940) – American nurse, writer, human rights activist, suffragist and pacifist
 Julia Grace Wales (1881–1957) – Canadian academic and pacifist
 John Wallach (1943–2002) – American journalist, founder of Seeds of Peace
 Alyn Ware (born 1962) – New Zealand peace educator and campaigner, global coordinator for Parliamentarians for Nuclear Non-Proliferation and Disarmament since 2002
 Roger Waters (born 1943) – English musician, co-founder of Pink Floyd, and anti-war activist
 Christopher Weeramantry (1926–2017) – President of the International Association of Lawyers against Nuclear Arms, former Sri Lankan Supreme Court Judge
 Matilda Widegren (1863–1938) – Swedish educator and committed peace activist
 Mary Wilhelmine Williams (1878–1944) – American historian, feminist and pacifist
 Owen Wilkes (1940–2005) – New Zealand peace researcher and activist
 Anita Parkhurst Willcox (1892–1984) – American artist, feminist, pacifist
 Betty Williams (1943–2020) – Nobel peace laureate for her work towards bringing about reconciliation in Northern Ireland
 Jody Williams (born 1950) – American anti-landmine advocate and organizer, Nobel peace laureate
 Waldo Williams (1904–1971) – Welsh language poet, Christian pacifist and Quaker, opposed the Korean War and conscription, imprisoned for refusing to pay taxes which could fund war
 George Willoughby (1914–2010) – American Quaker peace activist, co-founder of the Movement for a New Society and of Peace Brigades International
 Brian Willson (born 1941) – American veteran, peace activist and lawyer
 Lawrence S. Wittner (born 1941) – American peace historian, researcher, and movement activist
 Lilian Wolfe (1875–1974) – British anarchist, pacifist, feminist
 Walter Wolfgang (1923–2019) – German-born British activist
 Ann Wright (born 1947) – retired US army colonel and State Department official who resigned in opposition to the 2003 US invasion of Iraq, becoming a peace activist and antiwar campaigner
 Louise Wright (1861–1935) – Danish philanthropist, feminist and peace activist
 Mien van Wulfften Palthe (1875–1960) – Dutch feminist, suffragist and pacifist
 David Wylie (born 1929) – American attorney, author, and peace activist

X
 Lluís Maria Xirinacs (1932–2007) – Catalan politician, writer, catholic cleric, nonviolent activist and advocate for the independence of Catalonia.

Y
 Peter Yarrow (born 1938) – American singer-songwriter, anti-war activist
 Cheng Yen (born 1937) – Taiwanese Buddhist nun (bhikkhuni) and founder of Tzu Chi Foundation
 Ada Yonath (born 1939) – Israeli Laureate of the Nobel Prize in Chemistry, 2009, pacifist
 Yosano Akiko (1878–1942) – Japanese writer, feminist, pacifist
 Edip Yüksel (born 1957) – Kurdish-Turkish-American lawyer/author, Islamic peace proponent
 Malala Yousafzai (born 1997) – Pakistani peace advocate

Z
 L. L. Zamenhof (1859–1917) – creator of Esperanto, the most widely used constructed international auxiliary language, fascinated by the idea of a world without war
 Alfred-Maurice de Zayas (born 1947) – Cuban-born American historian, lawyer in international law and human rights, vociferous critic of military interventions and the use of torture
 Angie Zelter (born 1951) – British anti-war and anti-nuclear activist, co-founder of Trident Ploughshares
 Clara Zetkin (1857–1933) – German Marxist, feminist and pacifist
 Else Zeuthen (1897–1975) – Danish peace activist and feminist
 Howard Zinn (1922–2010) – American historian, writer, peace advocate
 Arnold Zweig (1887–1968) – German writer and anti-war activist

See also

 Anti-nuclear protests
 Anti-war movement
 Bed-In
 Department of Peace
 Gandhi Peace Award
 Gandhi Peace Prize
 Great Law of Peace
 Indira Gandhi Prize
 League to Enforce Peace
 List of anti-war organizations
 List of anti-war songs
 List of books with anti-war themes
 List of peace prizes
 List of peace processes
 List of plays with anti-war themes
 Nobel Peace Prize laureates
 Non-interventionism
 Nonviolent resistance
 Nuclear disarmament
 Open Christmas Letter
 Otto Hahn Peace Medal
 Pacifism
 Pacifism in the United States
 Parliament Square Peace Campaign
 Peace
 Peace and conflict studies
 Peace churches
 Peace conference
 Peace congress
 Peace education
 Peacemaking
 Peace makers
 Peace movement
 Peace Testimony
 United States Institute of Peace
 University for Peace
 War resister
 War Resisters League
 White House Peace Vigil
 World Congress of Imams and Rabbis for Peace
 World peace

Notes

Citations

Sources

Further reading

 
 
Lists of social activists
Pacifists
Peace movements